Cannibal Holocaust is a 1980 Italian found footage cannibal horror film directed by Ruggero Deodato and written by Gianfranco Clerici. It stars Robert Kerman as Harold Monroe, an anthropologist from New York University who leads a rescue team into the Amazon rainforest to locate a crew of filmmakers. Played by Carl Gabriel Yorke, Francesca Ciardi, Perry Pirkanen, and Luca Barbareschi, the crew had gone missing while filming a documentary on local cannibal tribes. When the rescue team is only able to recover the crew's lost cans of film, an American television station wishes to broadcast the footage as a sensationalized television special. Upon viewing the reels, Monroe is appalled by the team's actions and objects to the station's intent to air the documentary.

Produced as part of the contemporary cannibal trend of Italian exploitation cinema, Cannibal Holocaust was inspired by Italian media coverage of Red Brigades terrorism. The coverage included news reports that Deodato believed to be staged, an idea which became an integral aspect of the film's story. Additional story elements were influenced by the documentaries of Mondo director Gualtiero Jacopetti, including the presentation of the documentary crew's lost footage, which constitutes approximately half of the film. The treatment of this footage, which is noted for its visual realism, innovated the found footage style of filmmaking that was later popularized in American cinema by The Blair Witch Project. Cannibal Holocaust was filmed primarily on location in the Amazon rainforest of Colombia with a cast of indigenous tribes interacting with mostly inexperienced American and Italian actors recruited in New York City.

Cannibal Holocaust achieved notoriety as its graphic violence aroused a great deal of controversy. After its premiere in Italy, it was ordered to be seized by a local magistrate, and Deodato was arrested on obscenity charges. He was later charged with multiple counts of murder due to rumors that claimed several actors were killed on camera. Although Deodato was cleared of these charges, the film was banned in Italy, Australia, and several other countries due to its graphic content, including sexual assault and genuine violence toward animals. Although some nations have since revoked the ban, it is still upheld in several countries. Critical reception of the film is mixed, although it has received a cult following. The film's plot and violence have been noted as subtextual commentary on ethics in journalism, exploitation of South American countries, and the difference between Western and non-Western countries, yet these interpretations have also been met with criticism, with any perceived subtext deemed hypocritical or insincere due to the film's presentation. Many sequels were filmed, but none of them by the original crew or backers.

Plot
An American film crew disappear in the Amazon rainforest while filming a documentary about indigenous cannibal tribes. The team consists of Alan Yates, the director; Faye Daniels, script writer; and two cameramen, Jack Anders and Mark Tomaso. Harold Monroe, an anthropologist at New York University, agrees to lead a rescue mission in hopes of finding the missing filmmakers. In anticipation of his arrival, military personnel stationed in the rainforest conduct a raid on the local Yacumo tribe and take a young male hostage in order to negotiate with the natives. Monroe flies in via floatplane and is introduced to his guides, Chaco and his assistant, Miguel.

After several days of trekking through the jungle, the rescue team encounters the Yacumo. They arrange the release of their hostage in exchange for being taken to the Yacumo village. Once there, the group is initially greeted with hostility and learns that the filmmakers caused great unrest among the people. The next day, Monroe and his guides head deeper into the rainforest to locate two warring cannibal tribes, the Ya̧nomamö and the Shamatari. They encounter a group of Shamatari warriors and follow them to a riverbank, where Monroe's team saves a smaller group of Ya̧nomamö from death. The Ya̧nomamö invite the team back to their village in gratitude, but they are still suspicious of the foreigners. To gain their trust, Monroe bathes naked in a river, where he is joined by a group of Ya̧nomamö women. The women lead Monroe from the river to a shrine, where he discovers the skeletal remains of the filmmakers with their film reels nearby. Shocked by what he sees, he confronts the Ya̧nomamö in the village, during which time he plays music from a tape recorder. The intrigued natives agree to trade it for the filmmakers' surviving reels of film.

Back in New York, executives of the Pan American Broadcasting System invite Monroe to host a broadcast of the documentary to be made from the recovered film, but Monroe insists on viewing the raw footage before making a decision. One of the executives first introduces him to Alan's work by showing an excerpt from his previous documentary, The Last Road to Hell, after which she informs Monroe that Alan staged dramatic scenes to get more exciting footage. Monroe then begins to view the recovered footage, which first follows the group's trek through the rainforest. After walking for days, their guide, Felipe, is bitten by a venomous snake. The group amputates Felipe's leg with a machete to save his life, but he dies and is left behind. Upon locating the Yacumo in a clearing, Jack shoots one in the leg so they can easily follow him to the village. Once they arrive, the crew proceeds to intimidate the tribe before herding the natives into a hut, which they burn down in order to stage a massacre for their film. Monroe expresses apprehension about the staged footage and the treatment of the natives, but his concerns are ignored.

After he finishes viewing the remaining footage, Monroe expresses his disgust toward the station's decision to air the documentary. To convince the executives otherwise, he shows them the remaining unedited footage that only he has seen. The final two reels begin with the filmmakers locating a Ya̧nomamö girl, whom the men take turns raping against Faye's protests, stating they are wasting film footage. They later encounter the same girl impaled on a wooden pole by a riverbank, where they claim that the natives killed her for loss of virginity, although it is implied that the group themselves killed her and staged it as a murder by the natives for dramatic effect. Shortly afterwards, they are attacked by the Ya̧nomamö tribe as revenge for the girl's rape and death. Jack is hit by a spear, and Alan shoots him to prevent his escape. The scene then moves to the crew filming the natives undressing Jack in their captivity and cutting his genitalia off with a large machete before completely mutilating Jack's lifeless body. Shortly afterwards, an exhausted Alan says they have gotten completely lost trying to escape, and are now surrounded by the natives who pursued them. As a last resort, Alan attempts to scare them off with a flare gun. During the commotion, Faye is captured by the Ya̧nomamö. Alan insists that they attempt to rescue her, but Mark continues to film as she is stripped naked, gang-raped, beaten to death, and beheaded. The Ya̧nomamö then locate and kill the last two team members as the camera drops to the ground. Disturbed by what they have seen, the executives order all of the footage to be burned. As Monroe leaves, he ponders "who the real cannibals are".

Cast

 Robert Kerman as Professor Harold Monroe
 Gabriel Yorke as Alan Yates
 Luca Giorgio Barbareschi as Mark Tomaso
 Francesca Ciardi as Faye Daniels
 Perry Pirkanen as Jack Anders
 Salvatore Basile as Chaco
 Ricardo Fuentes
 Paolo Paoloni as Executive
 Lionello Pio Di Savoia as Executive
 Luigina Rocchi
 Kate Weiman as Executive 
 Enrico Papa as TV Interviewer 
 David Sage as Mr. Yates 
 Ruggero Deodato as Man on University Campus

Production

Development

Production on Cannibal Holocaust began in 1979, when director Ruggero Deodato was contacted by West German film distributors to make a film similar to his previous work, Last Cannibal World. He accepted the project and immediately went in search of a producer, choosing his friend Francesco Palaggi. The two first flew to Colombia to scout filming locations. Leticia, Colombia was chosen as the principal filming location after Deodato met a Colombian documentary filmmaker at the airport in Bogotá, who suggested the town as a location ideal for filming. Other locations had been considered, specifically those where Gillo Pontecorvo's Burn! had been shot, but Deodato rejected these locations due to lack of suitable rainforest.

Deodato conceived of the film's premise while talking to his son about news coverage of the terrorism of the Red Brigades. Deodato thought that the media focused on portraying violence with little regard for journalistic integrity and believed that journalists staged certain news angles in order to obtain more sensational footage. The Italian media was symbolized by the behavior in the film team in Cannibal Holocaust, the depiction of whom was also influenced by the works of Gualtiero Jacopetti, a documentary filmmaker of whom Deodato was a fan. Jacopetti and his partner, Franco Prosperi, are credited with popularizing Mondo films, a genre of documentary, with their first release, Mondo cane. Mondo films focused on sensational and graphic content from around the world, including local customs, violence, sexuality, and death. Deodato included similar content in Cannibal Holocaust, such as graphic violence and animal death, and the documentary that is produced in Cannibal Holocaust resembles a Mondo film. The scene of Monroe bathing naked in a river and the scene of a forced abortion rite have also been noted as being similar to scenes in Antonio Climati's Mondo film Savana violenta.

The Italian screenwriter Gianfranco Clerici wrote the script under the working title Green Inferno. He had collaborated with Deodato in his previous films Ultimo mondo cannibale and The House on the Edge of the Park, the latter of which was filmed before Cannibal Holocaust but released afterward. The screenplay included multiple scenes that did not make the film's final cut, including a scene in which a group of Ya̧nomamö cuts off the leg of a Shamatari warrior and feeds him to piranhas in a river. This scene was to take place directly after Monroe's team rescues a smaller group of Ya̧nomamö from the Shamatari. Attempts were made to film this scene, but the underwater camera did not operate properly, and the piranha were difficult to control. As a result, Deodato abandoned his efforts, and still photographs taken during the scene's setup are its only known depiction. The originally scripted version of The Last Road to Hell, which was written to depict soldiers advancing upon an enemy position, also went unused, as Deodato instead decided to use stock footage of political executions for the segment in order to draw further parallels to the films of Jacopetti. The character names Mark Williams and Shanda Tommaso in Clerici's screenplay were also changed to Mark Tomaso and Faye Daniels, respectively, in the film.

Casting
 
Deodato decided to film Cannibal Holocaust in English in order to appeal to a wider audience and to lend the film credibility. However, the film had to establish a European nationality so that it could be more easily distributed among European countries. Under Italian law, for the film to be recognized as Italian, at least two actors who spoke Italian as a native language had to star in the film. Luca Giorgio Barbareschi and Francesca Ciardi, two inexperienced students from the Actors Studio in New York City, were cast as Mark Tomaso and Faye Daniels, respectively, in part because they were native Italian speakers who also spoke English. Deodato also hired an American from the Actors Studio, Perry Pirkanen, to play Jack Anders.

A friend of Pirkanen was initially cast to play Alan Yates, but he dropped out of the film shortly before the production team left for the Amazon. He instead appears in the film as an ex-colleague of Yates. Casting director Bill Williams subsequently contacted Carl Gabriel Yorke to play the role. Yorke, a stage actor who had studied under Uta Hagen, was chosen in part because he was the right size for the costumes and boots, which had already been purchased. Because Cannibal Holocaust was a non-union production, Yorke originally wanted to be credited under the stage name Christopher Savage, although he ultimately decided it to be unnecessary due to the film's obscurity and remote filming location.

Robert Kerman had years of experience working in adult films under the pseudonym R. Bolla, including the well-known Debbie Does Dallas, before breaking into the Italian film industry. Kerman was recommended to Deodato for his previous film, The Concorde Affair, in which Kerman played an air traffic controller, and his performance impressed Deodato enough to have Kerman cast as Harold Monroe in Cannibal Holocaust. Kerman went on to star in the Italian cannibal films Eaten Alive! and Cannibal Ferox, both directed by Umberto Lenzi. Kerman's girlfriend at the time was cast as one of the station executives, as she was available to film in both New York City and Rome.

Direction
Film historian David Kerekes contends that the film's sense of reality is based on the direction and the treatment of the film team's recovered footage, noting that the "shaky hand-held camerawork commands a certain realism, and 'The Green Inferno,' the ill-fated team's film-within-a-film here, is no exception", and that "this very instability gives the 'Green Inferno' film its authentic quality." David Carter of the cult horror webzine Savage Cinema says that Deodato's methods added a first-person narration quality to the film team's footage, writing: "The viewer feels as if they are there with the crew, experiencing the horrors with them." Deodato was proud of other aspects of the cinematography, namely the numerous moving shots using a standard, shoulder-mounted camera, foregoing the use of a steadicam.

Kerekes noted the animal slaughter and inclusion of footage from The Last Road to Hell as adding to the sense of reality of the film. Lloyd Kaufman of Troma Entertainment compares these scenes to Vsevolod Pudovkin's theory of montage, saying: "In Cannibal Holocaust, we see the actors kill and rip apart a giant sea turtle and other animals. [...] The brain has been conditioned to accept that which it's now seeing as real. This mixture of real and staged violence, combined with the handheld camerawork and the rough, unedited quality of the second half of the movie, is certainly enough to convince someone that what they are watching is real." Deodato says he included the execution footage in The Last Road to Hell to draw further similarities to Cannibal Holocaust and the Mondo filmmaking of Gualtiero Jacopetti.

Filming
Principal photography began on 4 June 1979. The scenes featuring the film team were shot first with handheld 16mm cameras in a cinéma vérité style that mimicked an observational documentary, a technique Deodato had learned from his mentor Roberto Rossellini. This same style was also used by Climati in his Mondo film Ultime grida dalla savana, which may have been influential on Deodato's direction. After shooting with the film team was completed, Kerman flew down to film his scenes in the rainforest and then to New York to film exterior shots in the city. Leticia was only accessible by aircraft, and from there, the cast and crew had to travel by boat to reach the set. The interior shots of New York were filmed later in a studio in Rome.

Production on the film was delayed numerous times while in the Amazon. After the actor originally cast as Alan Yates dropped out of the role, filming was halted for two weeks until new casting calls were completed and Yorke arrived in Leticia. During principal filming with Kerman, the father of the actor who played Miguel was murdered, and production was again halted as the actor flew back to Bogotá to attend his father's funeral. The locale also presented problems for the production, in particular the heat and sudden rain storms, which sporadically delayed filming.

Interpersonal relationships were strained on the set. Kerman and Deodato frequently clashed, as the two got into long, drawn-out arguments every day of shooting, usually because of remarks made by Deodato to which Kerman took offense. Although Deodato noted that the two were always friendly again a few minutes later, Kerman expressed his personal dislike of Deodato in several interviews. He described Deodato as remorseless and uncaring on set and stated that he did not believe that Deodato had a soul. Kerman also noted hostile treatment of other cast and crew members by Deodato, stating: "He was a sadist. He was particularly sadistic to people that couldn't answer back, people that were Colombian, [and] people that were Italian but could be sent home." Yorke and co-star Perry Pirkanen also did not get along, which Yorke attributed to disappointment that Pirkanen felt after his friend dropped out of the production. Yorke also alienated Ciardi after he declined to have sex with her in preparation for filming their sex scene.

Multiple cast and crew members were uncomfortable with the film's graphic content, in particular the genuine killing of animals. Yorke described the shoot as having "a level of cruelty unknown to me" and was initially unsure if he was taking part in a snuff film. When his character was scripted to kill a pig on camera, Yorke refused, leaving the duty to Luca Barbareschi. Yorke had traveled with the pig to the set and felt he had formed a relationship with the animal. When it was shot, the emotional impact of hearing the pig squeal subsequently caused Yorke to botch a long monologue, and retakes were not an option because the production did not have access to additional pigs. Kerman similarly objected to the killing of the coati and stormed off the set while its death scene was filmed; he had repeatedly pressed Deodato to let the animal go in the minutes leading up to filming. Pirkanen cried after filming the butchering of a turtle, and crew members vomited off camera when a squirrel monkey was killed for the film.

The film's sexual content also proved a point of contention among the cast members. Ciardi did not want to bare her breasts during the sex scene between her and Yorke, and she became agitated with him during the filming of the scene. When she refused to comply with the direction, Deodato led her off the set and screamed at her in Italian until she agreed to perform the scene as instructed. Yorke also became severely upset while filming a scene in which his character takes a part in the rape of a native girl. The film's content had given Yorke anxiety throughout his time in Colombia, and this tension peaked during the rape scene. His experiences on set ultimately weighed so heavily on him that Yorke ended his relationship with his girlfriend in New York shortly after his return from the Amazon.

Yorke experienced unfair payment practices when his first payment for the film came in the form of Colombian pesos and was less than what had been agreed upon. He refused to continue shooting until he was paid the correct amount in United States dollars. The native extras also went unpaid for their work despite their involvement in numerous dangerous scenes, including a scene in which they were forced to stay inside a burning hut for a prolonged period of time.

Soundtrack

The film's soundtrack was composed entirely by Italian composer Riz Ortolani, whom Deodato specifically requested because of Ortolani's work in Mondo Cane. Deodato was particularly fond of the film's main theme, "Ti guarderò nel cuore", which was given lyrics and became a worldwide pop hit under the title "More". The music of Cannibal Holocaust is a variety of styles, from a gentle melody in the "Main Theme", to a sad and flowing score in "Crucified Woman", and faster and more upbeat tracks in "Cameraman's Recreation", "Relaxing in the Savannah", and "Drinking Coco", to the sinister-sounding "Massacre of the Troupe". The instrumentation is equally mixed, ranging from full orchestras to electronics and synthesizers.

The track "Cannibal Holocaust (Main Theme)" was later used in the American teen series Euphoria, where it was played during the closing credits for the season 2 episode "The Theater and Its Double".

Track listing

Release
Cannibal Holocaust premiered on 7 February 1980 in the Italian city of Milan. Although the courts later confiscated the film based on a citizen's complaint, the initial audience reaction was positive. After seeing the film, director Sergio Leone wrote a letter to Deodato, which stated (translated): "Dear Ruggero, what a movie! The second part is a masterpiece of cinematographic realism, but everything seems so real that I think you will get in trouble with all the world." In the ten days before it was seized, the film had grossed approximately $2 million. In Japan, it grossed $21 million, becoming the second highest-grossing film of that time after E.T. the Extraterrestrial. Deodato has claimed the film has grossed as much as $200 million worldwide in the wake of its various re-releases.

Critical response
Critics remain split on their stances of Cannibal Holocaust. Supporters of the film cite it as a serious and well-made social commentary on the modern world. Sean Axmaker praised the structure and setup of the film, saying: "It's a weird movie with an awkward narrative, which Deodato makes all the more effective with his grimy sheen of documentary realism, while Riz Ortolani's unsettlingly lovely, elegiac score provides a weird undercurrent." Jason Buchanan of AllMovie said: "While it's hard to defend the director for some of the truly repugnant images with which he has chosen to convey his message, there is indeed an underlying point to the film, if one is able to look beyond the sometimes unwatchable images that assault the viewer."

Detractors, however, criticize the over-the-top gore and the genuine animal slayings and also point to the hypocrisy that the film presents. Nick Schager criticized the brutality of the film, saying: "As clearly elucidated by its shocking gruesomeness—as well as its unabashedly racist portrait of indigenous folks it purports to sympathize with [the real indigenous peoples in Brazil whose names were used in the film—the Ya̧nomamö and Shamatari—are not fierce enemies as portrayed in the film, nor is either tribe truly cannibalistic, although the Ya̧nomamö do partake in a form of post-mortem ritual cannibalism]—the actual savages involved with Cannibal Holocaust are the ones behind the camera."

Robert Firsching of AllMovie made similar criticisms of the film's content, saying: "While the film is undoubtedly gruesome enough to satisfy fans, its mixture of nauseating mondo animal slaughter, repulsive sexual violence, and pie-faced attempts at socially conscious moralizing make it rather distasteful morally as well." Slant Magazine'''s Eric Henderson said it is "artful enough to demand serious critical consideration, yet foul enough to christen you a pervert for even bothering."

In recent years, Cannibal Holocaust has received accolades in various publications as well as a cult following. Review aggregator website Rotten Tomatoes gives the film an approval rating of 67% based on 18 reviews, with a weighted average of 5.5/10. British film magazine Total Film ranked Cannibal Holocaust as the tenth greatest horror film of all time, and the film was included in a similar list of the top 25 horror films compiled by Wired. The film also came in eighth on IGNs list of the ten greatest grindhouse films.

InterpretationsCannibal Holocaust is seen by some critics as social commentary on various aspects of modern civilization by comparing Western society to that of the cannibals. David Carter says: "Cannibal Holocaust is not merely focused on the societal taboo of flesh eating. The greater theme of the film is the difference between the civilized and the uncivilized. Though the graphic violence can be hard for most to stomach, the most disturbing aspect of the film is what Deodato is saying about modern society. The film asks the questions 'What is it to be 'civilized'?' and 'Is it a good thing? Mark Goodall, author of Sweet & Savage: The World Through the Shockumentary Film Lens, also contends the film's message is [to show] "the rape of the natural world by the unnatural; the exploitation of 'primitive' cultures for Western entertainment."

Deodato's intentions regarding the Italian media coverage of the Red Brigades have also fallen under critical examination and has been expanded to include all sensationalism. Carter explores this, claiming that "[the lack of journalistic integrity] is shown through the interaction between Professor Monroe and the news agency that had backed the documentary crew. They continually push Monroe to finish editing the footage because blood and guts equal ratings." Lloyd Kaufman claims that this form of exploitative journalism can still be seen in the media today and in programming such as reality television. Goodall and film historians David Slater and David Kerekes have also suggested that Deodato was attempting to comment on the documentary works of Antonio Climati with his film.

Despite these interpretations, Deodato has said in interviews that he had no intentions in Cannibal Holocaust but to make a film about cannibals. Actor Luca Barbareschi asserts this as well and believes that Deodato only uses his films to "put on a show". Robert Kerman contradicts these assertions, stating that Deodato did tell him of political concerns involving the media in the making of this film.

These interpretations have also been criticized as hypocritical and poor justification for the film's content, as Cannibal Holocaust itself is highly sensationalized. Firsching claims that "The fact that the film's sole spokesperson for the anti-exploitation perspective is played by porn star Robert Kerman should give an indication of where its sympathies lie", while Schager says Deodato is "pathetically justifying the unrepentant carnage by posthumously damning his eaten filmmaker protagonists with a 'who are the real monsters – the cannibals or us?' anti-imperialism morale."

Controversies
Since its original release, Cannibal Holocaust has been the target of censorship by moral and animal activists. Other than graphic gore, the film contains several scenes of sexual violence and genuine cruelty to animals, issues which find Cannibal Holocaust in the midst of controversy to this day. Due to this notoriety, Cannibal Holocaust has been marketed as having been banned in over 50 countries. In 2006, Entertainment Weekly magazine named Cannibal Holocaust as the 20th most controversial film of all time.

Snuff film allegations

Ten days after its premiere in Milan, Cannibal Holocaust was confiscated under the orders of a local magistrate, and Ruggero Deodato was charged with obscenity. As all copies were to be turned over to the authorities, the film was released in other countries like the United Kingdom via subterfuge. In January 1981, during the film's theatrical run in France, the magazine Photo suggested that certain deaths depicted in the film were real, which would have made Cannibal Holocaust a snuff film. Following the publication of the Photo article, the charges against Deodato were amended to include murder. The courts believed that the actors who portrayed the missing film crew and the native actress featured in the impalement scene were killed for the camera.

Compounding matters was the fact that the supposedly deceased actors had signed contracts with the production which ensured that they would not appear in any type of media, motion pictures, or commercials for one year following the film's release. This was done in order to promote the idea that Cannibal Holocaust was truly the recovered footage of missing documentarians. During the subsequent court proceedings, questions arose as to why the actors were in no other media if they were alive as Deodato claimed.

To prove his innocence, Deodato had Luca Barbareschi get in contact with the other three actors, and the four of them were interviewed for an Italian television show. Deodato also explained in court how the special effect in the impalement scene was achieved: a bicycle seat was attached to the end of an iron pole, upon which the actress sat. She then held a short length of balsa wood in her mouth and looked skyward, thus giving the appearance of impalement. Deodato also provided the court with pictures of the girl interacting with the crew after the scene had been filmed. After they were presented with this evidence, the courts dropped all murder charges against Deodato.

Censorship
Although the snuff film allegations were successfully refuted, the Italian courts decided to ban Cannibal Holocaust due to the genuine animal slayings, citing animal cruelty laws. Deodato, Franco Palaggi, Franco Di Nunzio, Gianfranco Clerici, producer Alda Pia and United Artists Europa representative Sandro Perotti each received a four-month suspended sentence after they were all convicted of obscenity and violence. Deodato fought in the courts for three additional years to get his film unbanned. In 1984, the courts ruled in favor of Deodato, and Cannibal Holocaust was granted a rating certificate of VM18 for a cut print. It would later be re-released uncut.Cannibal Holocaust also faced censorship issues in other countries around the world. In 1981, video releases were not required to pass before the British Board of Film Censors (BBFC), which had power to ban films in the United Kingdom. Cannibal Holocaust was released straight-to-video there, thus avoiding the possible banning of the film. This did not save the movie, however, because in 1983, the Director of Public Prosecutions compiled a list of 72 video releases that were not brought before the BBFC for certification and declared them prosecutable for obscenity. This list of "video nasties" included Cannibal Holocaust, which was successfully prosecuted and banned. The film was not approved for release in the UK until 2001, albeit with nearly six minutes of mandated cuts. In 2011, the BBFC waived all but one of these previous edits and passed Cannibal Holocaust with fifteen seconds of cuts. It was determined that the only scene that breached the BBFC's guidelines was the killing of a coatimundi, and the BBFC acknowledged that previous cuts were reactionary to the film's reputation.

The film was also banned in Australia, the United States, Norway, Finland, Iceland, New Zealand, Singapore and several other countries in or before 1984. The movie was briefly released in the US by Trans American Films in 1985, but this release lasted for less than a month before being pulled from theaters, likely due to the large controversies surrounding the film. It would eventually get a two-disc DVD release in 2005 by Grindhouse Releasing. In 2005, the Office of Film and Literature Classification in Australia lifted the ban, passing Cannibal Holocaust with an R18+ rating for the uncut print, including the consumer advice, "High level sexual violence, high level violence, animal cruelty." In 2006, the film was rejected for classification and banned in its entirety by the OFLC in New Zealand. Cuts to retain an R18 classification were offered by the Office, but they were eventually refused.

Animal cruelty
Many of the censorship issues with Cannibal Holocaust concern the on-screen killings of animals. Deodato himself has condemned his past actions, saying: "I was stupid to introduce animals." Although six animal deaths appear onscreen, seven animals were killed for the production, as the scene depicting the monkey's death was shot twice, resulting in the death of two monkeys. Both of the animals were eaten by indigenous cast members, who consider monkey brains a delicacy. The animals that were killed onscreen were:
 a coati (mistaken for a muskrat in the film), killed with a knife
 an arrau turtle, decapitated and its limbs, shell, and entrails removed
 a tarantula, killed with a machete
 a boa constrictor, also killed with a machete
 a squirrel monkey, decapitated with a machete
 a pig, shot in the head with a .22 caliber rifle at point blank range

Film historian Andrew DeVos has argued that the animal deaths have been harshly condemned because of the film's classification as exploitation, whereas animal mutilations in films perceived by critics to be classics or art films are often ignored. DeVos cites several examples of this double standard, including The Rules of the Game, El Topo, Wake in Fright, and Apocalypse Now. The BBFC made a similar conclusion regarding the censorship of scenes in which the deaths were quick and painless, noting: "Removing these sequences would be inconsistent with the BBFC's decisions to permit quick clean kills in several other films, such as Apocalypse Now."

LegacyCannibal Holocaust was innovative in its plot structure, specifically with the concept of the "found footage" being brought back to civilization and later viewed to determine the fate of the crew that shot it. This was later popularized as a distinct style in Hollywood cinema by The Last Broadcast and The Blair Witch Project, both of which use similar storytelling devices. Each film uses the idea of a lost film team making a documentary in the wilderness, and their footage returned. Advertisements for The Blair Witch Project also promoted the idea that the footage is genuine. Deodato has acknowledged the similarities between his film and The Blair Witch Project, and though he holds no malice against the producers, he is frustrated at the publicity that The Blair Witch Project received for being an original production. The producers of The Last Broadcast have denied that Cannibal Holocaust was a major influence. Nonetheless, the film was cited by director Paco Plaza as a source of inspiration for the found footage films REC and REC 2.Cannibal Holocaust has been regarded as the apex of the cannibal genre, and it bears similarities to subsequent cannibal films made during the same time period. Cannibal Ferox also stars Kerman and Pirkanen, and star Giovanni Lombardo Radice says it was made based on the success of Cannibal Holocaust. Cannibal Ferox has also been noted as containing similar themes to Cannibal Holocaust, such as comparison of Western violence to perceived uncivilized cultures and anti-imperialism. In a mixed review, film journalist Jay Slater claims: "Certainly a tough customer, Cannibal Ferox still fails where Deodato succeeds. [...] Lenzi attempts to tackle cultural defilement and racial issues, but Cannibal Ferox is nothing more than a shoddy exercise in sadism and animal cruelty." Reviewer Andrew Parkinson also notes: "At the end, there is a basic attempt to validate Cannibal Ferox, posing that old chestnut of whether civilised man is actually more savage than the uncivilised tribespeople."

Unofficial sequels to Cannibal Holocaust were produced in the years following its release. The titles of these films were changed following their original theatrical releases in order to associate the film with Cannibal Holocaust in different markets. In 1985, Mario Gariazzo directed Schiave bianche: violenza in Amazzonia, which was also released as Cannibal Holocaust 2: The Catherine Miles Story. In addition to the new title, Slater notes similarities between the score in The Catherine Miles Story and Riz Ortolani's score in Cannibal Holocaust. Previously known for his work in Mondo films, Antonio Climati directed Natura contro in 1988, which was released as Cannibal Holocaust II in the United Kingdom.

In 2005, Deodato announced that he planned to make a companion piece to Cannibal Holocaust entitled Cannibals. Deodato was originally hesitant about directing his new film, as he thought that he would make it too violent for American audiences. However, while he was in Prague filming his cameo appearance in Hostel: Part II for Eli Roth, Deodato viewed Hostel and decided that he would direct after all, citing it as a similarly violent film that was given a mainstream release in the United States. Although the screenplay, written by Christine Conradt, was completed, a financial conflict between Deodato and the film's producer led to the project's cancellation. In 2013, Roth directed The Green Inferno, which takes its title from the fictional documentary produced in Cannibal Holocaust. Roth's film was intended as an homage to Cannibal Holocaust and other cannibal films from the same era.

The film's influence has extended to other media as well. In 2001, Death metal band Necrophagia released a song entitled "Cannibal Holocaust" from the eponymous record.

It was revealed in April 2020, that the movie would be getting a video game sequel called Ruggero Deodato, Cannibal. The game is being developed by Fantastico Studios and was expected to be available from November 2020 for Nintendo Switch, PlayStation 4, Xbox One, PC and mobile. However, in December 2020, the game was retitled Borneo: A Jungle Nightmare and delayed to Spring 2021, but has yet to be released.

Alternate versions (home media)
Due to its graphic content, there are several different versions in circulation, edited to varying degrees. In the United Kingdom, it was originally released on VHS by Go Video in 1982 with approximately six minutes of cuts. These cuts were self-imposed by the distributor, possibly due to technical limitations of the tape. In 2001, the film was passed for release on DVD by the British Board of Film Classification with five minutes and 44 seconds of cuts to remove scenes of animal cruelty and sexual violence; all but 15 seconds of these cuts were waived for a re-release in 2011. The latter also includes a new edit sponsored by Deodato, which reduces the violence toward animals. Grindhouse Releasing's home video releases contain an "Animal Cruelty Free" version that omits the six animal deaths. Other versions also contain alternative footage shot specifically for Middle Eastern markets that do not depict nudity.

There are multiple versions of the Last Road to Hell'' segment, which causes variances even among uncensored releases. An extended version includes approximately 10 seconds of footage not seen in an alternative, shorter version. This additional footage includes a wide-angle shot of firing-squad executions, a close-up of a dead victim and extended footage of bodies being carried into the back of a truck. The longer version also includes different titles that correctly name the film crew as they appear in the final film, while the shorter version gives the names that originally appear in the script.

In August 2022, UK based distributor 88 Films announced a newly restored 4K UHD Blu-ray will be available in November.

References

External links
 
 
 

1980 films
1980 horror films
1980s adventure films
1980 controversies
Film controversies
Film censorship in Italy
Film censorship in Iceland
Film censorship in New Zealand
Italian adventure films
Italian horror films
English-language Italian films
1980s Italian-language films
Films directed by Ruggero Deodato
Animal cruelty incidents in film
Cannibal-boom films
Films about animal cruelty
Films about filmmaking
Films about hunter-gatherers
Films about snuff films
Films set in 1979
Films set in New York City
Films set in South America
Films set in the Amazon
Films set in Venezuela
Films shot in Colombia
Films shot in New York City
Films shot in Rome
Found footage films
Italian independent films
Italian mockumentary films
Obscenity controversies in film
Rape and revenge films
Italian splatter films
United Artists films
Films scored by Riz Ortolani
Censored films
Films about missing people
Video nasties
1980s exploitation films
1980s Italian films